Paracucumidae is a family of sea cucumbers belonging to the order Dendrochirotida.

Genera:
 Crucella Gutt, 1990
 Paracucumis Mortensen, 1925

References

Dendrochirotida
Echinoderm families